Shamdat Sainudeen is an Indian cinematographer from Kerala, India. He has shot many films in Malayalam, Telugu, and Tamil, including Premayanamaha, The Tiger, Kerala Cafe, Marykkundoru Kunjaadu, and Uttama Villain. His directorial debut Street Lights released on 26 January 2018.

Filmography

References

External links
 

Living people
Malayalam film cinematographers
21st-century Indian photographers
Cinematographers from Kerala
Year of birth missing (living people)